Squalloscope (born Anna Kohlweis, Klagenfurt, Austria June 30, 1984) is an Austrian singer-songwriter, multimedia artist, illustrator and music producer. Between 2006 and 2011, she used the stage name Paperbird for her music.

Early life 
Kohlweis attended BRG Klagenfurt-Viktring Gymnasium, with an emphasis on musical education. From 2004 to 2009 she was enrolled at the University of Vienna, studying theater, film, and media studies; between 2008 and 2014 she completed her M.A. in Fine Arts at the Academy of Fine Arts, Vienna.

Discography

Studio albums 
 Peninsula (2006)
 Cryptozoology (2008)
 Thaumatrope (2009)
 Soft Invasions (2012)
 Exoskeletons for Children (2017)

EPs 
 Desert (2013)
 Dispenser Box (2015)
 Unpleasant Design (2016)

References 

1984 births
Living people
Austrian singer-songwriters
Artists from Klagenfurt
21st-century Austrian singers
Musicians from Klagenfurt